Art of Love (formerly titled Simone) is a 2022 Puerto Rican romantic thriller film directed by Betty Kaplan and starring Esai Morales and Kunjue Li.  It is based on the 2013 novel Simone by Eduardo Lalo, who co-wrote the screenplay with Kaplan.

Cast
Esai Morales as Professor/Writer
Kunjue Li as Li Chao
Caterina Murino as Carmen Lindo
Jim Lau as Wen Da/Old Bald Chinese
Bruno Irizarry as Máximo Noreña
Braulio Castillo Jr. as Dean Pedro Benitez
Zorie Fonalledas as Julia
Elí Cay as Garcia Pardo
Melanie Ramos as Lina/Skate Board Girl
Aris Mejias as Glenda

Production
Between March and June 2020, filming was halted due to the COVID-19 pandemic.

Release
In June 2022, it was announced that Samuel Goldwyn Films acquired U.S. distribution rights to the film, which was released in theaters and on digital platforms on July 22, 2022.

Reception
Concepción de León of The New York Times gave the film a negative review and wrote, "And the film reinforces the fiction that it is often younger women who seduce older men and not the other way around. The writing, which leaves much to be desired, underscores these issues."

References

External links
 
 

Film productions suspended due to the COVID-19 pandemic